The Ñuble Region, officially the Region of Ñuble, is — since 5 September 2018 – one of Chile's sixteen regions. It has a population of 480,609 inhabitants. Its capital is the city of Chillán.

According to a 2021 study Ñuble Region is one of the three Chilean regions that are most prone to suffer nepotism and elite capture.

History
This region has played a distinguished role in the history and culture of Chile. Many patriots who fought for independence, presidents, politicians, and artists, like pianist Claudio Arrau and folklorist Violeta Parra, were born here.

On August 20, 2015, President Michelle Bachelet signed the bill that converted the Ñuble Province into a Region, and its legislative process began on the 1 September 2015, while on 10 January 2017, the project was approved in the first constitutional process in the Senate with 28 votes in favor and 2 against. The project was processed in the Chamber of Deputies, where it was approved and dispatched on July 5 of the same year On 12 July 2017 the project was approved by the Senate chamber, with 26 votes in favor and only 2 against.

For 2017, after approval in the National Congress, the deputy Marcelo Chávez sends this project to the Constitutional Court of Chile to consider three articles as unconstitutional: the proportionality with respect to the number of senators in the region, the regional councilors who are elected for the Biobío Region they would move to the new region and the lack of consultation with the indigenous peoples In the defense of the bill, Senator Felipe Harboe presented himself. The court approved the creation of the Ñuble Region on 2 August 2017 and on August 19 of the same year, the law is signed by President Michelle Bachelet at the Sport's House of Chillán. In September 2017 the law was published in the Official Gazette, with the stipulation that it would come into force until one year after its publication, e.g., 5 September 2018.

Geography and demography
Between the 1992 and 2002 censuses, the population grew by 4.5% (18,854 people).

Provinces and Communes 

The Ñuble Region has 3 provinces and 21 communes.

Culture and tourism

Ñuble has a lot of attractions for tourists, including:
 The Termas de Chillán are a winter and summer tourist complex of the region, located among millenarian forests and inexhaustible thermal water sources.
 The Lleuques is a cordillerano bath located next to the Rengado River and which has beautiful places surrounded by mountains.
 Cobquecura located in the coastal sector, and has several beaches and places to make excursions (like the Calvario Hill).
 The commune of Quillón is home of the Avendaño Lagoon, for water-skiing, swimming, sailing, and rowing.
 The commune San Fabián de Alico, has beautiful landscapes is an excellent locality for excursions, camping and fishing.
 
Other places of interest are the Market and Fair of Chillán, one of the more beautiful and important artisan centers of Chile. Murals by Siqueiros were donated by the Government of Mexico. There is also Bernardo O'Higgins Monumental Park in the locality of Chillán Viejo.
 
Among the activities characteristic of Ñuble are crafts, in particular in the localities of Quinchamalí (considered like one of the country's more important places of artisan production of white clay pottery), Coihueco (characterized by the wood carvings and loom weaving), Ninhue and San Fabián de Alico.
 
In recent years Ñuble has consolidated an important forest sector, thanks to favorable climatic conditions land for the development of plantations of such rapidly growing trees as pinus radiata and eucalyptus globulus.
 
Ñuble has a variety of celebrations and events. Outstanding among these are the Rodeo, a celebration huasa that takes place between September and February. The Agro-Expo of San Carlos is an agricultural, cattle and artisan exhibition, with strong accent on dairying.
 The Carnival of Quillón, traditional celebration with artistic spectacles and dances.
 The Celebration of the Vendimia, the celebration of autumn in the locality of Santacruz de Cuca.
 The Festival of Creole Roots in Coihueco, which revives folkloric traditions.
 The gathering of Folkloric Roots of Portezuelo in the month of November brings together an important group of singers, artisan and cultural singers and expressions of rural sectors of Ñuble and the country.
 The celebrations of the Cherry and Esquila; this first occurs in December in Quinchamalí, with typical folkloric activities, meals, exhibitions and tasting of cherries, jams and liqueurs; second the Cardal "in the commune of Yungay takes place in the sector".
 
The region has the pride of being the home of patriots, artists and other men of note, including, Bernardo O'Higgins, Arturo Prat, Claudio Arrau, Ramón Vinay, and Violeta Parra.
 
Chillán, the capital of Ñuble, may be reached by the following routes:
  In airplane: Concepción is the nearest airport.
  In train: Terrasur of EFE (the national railway) Av. Brazil s/n Chillán Station.

Itata Valley wine region

The Itata Valley is a wine region in southern Chile and a Denomination of Origin (DO) is defined by the Chilean Appellation system, the legally defined and protected geographical indication used to identify where the grapes for a wine were grown.
The area is defined by the convergence of the Itata and Ñuble Rivers, and vineyards plantations are mostly found around the towns of Chillan, Quillon and Coelemu. The valley's western border is the Pacific Ocean, which has a cooling influence over the valley due to the cold Humboldt current that runs along most of Chile's coastline.
The cool Mediterranean climate suits Pais, Muscat of Alexandria and Carignan vines, and more recently, producers have begun to plant more modern grape varieties like Cabernet Sauvignon.

The soils are alluvial, made up of sand and clay from the Itata and Ñuble rivers. The region is located at a latitude of 36°S, a similar distance from the Equator as southern Spain or the central valley of California.

Grape distribution by varietal

 Climate: Cool Mediterranean climate.  of rain per year.
 Soils: Alluvial soils, clay and sand.
 Primary wines: Cabernet Sauvignon, Pais and Carignan.
 
 

 
Total hectares planted: .

See also
 Chilean wine
 Maule Region
 Maule River
 Maipo Valley

References 

 
Regions of Chile
States and territories established in 2018
2018 establishments in Chile
2018 in Chilean law